Sacred Heart Convent School, or SHCS, is a private Catholic  primary and secondary school for girls located in Lahore, Pakistan. It was established in 1908.

History
At the end of the 19th century, the Great Famine plagued the subcontinent. In 1897, the Roman Catholic hierarchy decided to send a group of nuns to care for the children who had been traumatised, abandoned and orphaned by the Famine. 

By 1906, the Great Famine ended and the number of children decreased, so the dome rooms which once composed the orphanage were left empty. At that time, financial support from abroad was withdrawn and making ends meet became difficult. The unoccupied rooms were transformed into Sacred Heart School. A notice was placed in the newspapers by Sister Marie de la Trinite Lootens to announce the opening of an all girls' school for both boarders and day scholars from affluent families. 

The school teaches Hindus, Muslims, Parsis, and Christians.

Principals
 Sister Martin de Porres

Notable alumni
Aruna Asaf Ali, freedom fighter
Nirlep Kaur, politician
Syed Babar Ali, founder of Packages Limited

See also

 Sacred Heart Cathedral, Lahore

References

External links
 Official website

Catholic secondary schools in Pakistan
Catholic elementary and primary schools in Pakistan
Schools in Lahore
Educational institutions established in 1908
1908 establishments in India